The Militär-Apparat MA-7, also known as the Häfeli MA-7 and K & W MA-7, was a prototype fighter designed by August Häfeli in Switzerland. It flew in two different engine configurations, neither of which were deemed satisfactory and so the type did not enter series production.

Design and development
Designed by August Häfeli in response to a Swiss Air Force requirement for an indigenous fighter design, the MA-7 was a biplane of fabric-covered wood construction with N-shaped wing struts like its predecessor the Fokker D.VI of 1918. Ailerons were installed only on the upper wing, which also contained an auxiliary gravity fuel tank. Power was provided by a  Hispano-Suiza 8Fb HS42 V-8 liquid-cooled engine manufactured in Switzerland under license. The aircraft was built by K & W in 1925 and handed over for trials in February 1926.

The prototype was returned to the manufacturer in April 1926 due to unsatisfactory flight characteristics and performance. K & W responded with the installation of an indigenous  LFW-12 X-1 engine. This, however, proved too large and heavy for the frame and entire MA-7 project was subsequently discontinued. The Swiss Air Force procured the French Dewoitine D.1 as their replacement fighter instead.

Records

Operators

 Swiss Air Force

Specifications

See also

References

1920s Swiss fighter aircraft
Single-engined tractor aircraft
Biplanes
Aircraft first flown in 1926